Night Without Pity is a 1961 British crime film directed by Theodore Zichy and starring Sarah Lawson, Neil McCallum, Alan Edwards and Michael Browning.

Plot summary
Two thieves take a woman and her injured son hostage while they attempt to rob a factory.

Cast
Sarah Lawson	...	Diana Martin
Neil McCallum	...	O'Brien
Alan Edwards	...	Randall
Dorinda Stevens	...	Girl Friend
Michael Browning	...	Philip
Patrick Newell	...	Doctor
Beatrice Varley	...	Mother
John Moulder-Brown	...	Geoffrey Martin
Brian Weske	...	Arthur
Vanda Godsell	...	Tart

References

External links 
 

1961 films
1961 crime films
British crime films
1960s English-language films
1960s British films